Murat Torun (born 27 May 1994) is a Turkish footballer who plays as a forward for Ağrı 1970 SK. He made his Süper Lig debut against Kasımpaşa on 24 November 2012.

External links
 
 

1994 births
People from Bakırköy
Footballers from Istanbul
Living people
Turkish footballers
Association football forwards
Orduspor footballers
Bayrampaşaspor footballers
24 Erzincanspor footballers
Manisaspor footballers
Gümüşhanespor footballers
Süper Lig players
TFF First League players
TFF Second League players
TFF Third League players